

D

Dachiardite (zeolitic tectosilicate) 9.GD.40
Dachiardite-Ca ( IMA1997 s.p., 1906) 9.GD.40   
Dachiardite-K (IMA2015-041) 9.GD.40  [no] [no]
Dachiardite-Na (IMA1997 s.p., 1975) 9.GD.40   [no]
Dadsonite (dadsonite: IMA1968-011) 2.HC.30    (Pb23Sb25S60Cl)
Dagenaisite (tellurium oxysalt: IMA2017-017) 7.A?.  [no] [no] (IUPAC: trizinc tellurium(VI) hexaoxide)
Daliranite (IMA2007-010) 2.JB.70  [no]  (IUPAC: lead mercury diarsenide hexasulfide)
Dalnegorskite (wollastonite: IMA2018-007) 9.D?.  [no] [no] (IUPAC: pentacalcium manganese di(nonaoxotrisilicate))
Dalnegroite (chabournéite: IMA2009-058) 2.HC.05e  [no] 
Dalyite (Y: 1952) 9.EA.25    (K2ZrSi6O15)
Damaraite (IMA1989-013) 3.DC.75    (IUPAC: trilead hydrodioxo chloride)
Damiaoite (alloy: IMA1995-041) 1.AG.55    (IUPAC: platinum diindium alloy)
Danalite (sodalite: 1866) 9.FB.10    (IUPAC: triberyllium tetrairon(II) tri(tetraoxysilicate) sulfide)
Danbaite (alloy: IMA1981-041) 1.AB.10b    (IUPAC: copper dizinc alloy)
Danburite (danburite: 1839) 9.FA.65    (IUPAC: calcium octaoxy diboro disilicate)
Danielsite (IMA1984-044) 2.BD.15   
D'ansite (d'ansite) 7.BC.05
D'ansite (IMA2007 s.p., 1958) 7.BC.05    (IUPAC: henicosasodium magnesium trichloro decasulfate)
D'ansite-(Fe) (IMA2011-065) 7.BC.  [no]  (IUPAC: henicosasodium iron(II) trichloro decasulfate)
D'ansite-(Mn) (IMA2011-064) 7.BC.  [no]  (IUPAC: henicosasodium manganese(II) trichloro decasulfate)
Dantopaite (pavonite: IMA2008-058) 2.JA.05  [no]  (Ag5Bi13S22)
Daomanite (Y: 1974) 2.LA.15    (IUPAC: copper platinum sulfarsenite)
Daqingshanite-(Ce) (IMA1981-063) 5.BF.15    (IUPAC: tristrontium cerium phosphate tricarbonate)
Darapiosite (milarite: IMA1974-056) 9.CM.05   
Darapskite (IMA1967 s.p., 1891) 7.DG.05      (IUPAC: trisodium sulfate nitrate monohydrate)
Dargaite (nabimusaite, arctite: IMA2015-068) 9.0  [no] [no]
Darrellhenryite (tourmaline: IMA2012-026) 9.CK.  [no] [no]
Dashkovaite (IMA2000-006) 10.AA.10    (IUPAC: magnesium formiate dihydrate)
Datolite (gadolinite: 1806) 9.AJ.20    (IUPAC: calcium boro tetraoxysilicate hydroxyl)
Daubréeite (matlockite: 1876) 3.DC.25    (IUPAC: hydrobismuth oxide)
Daubréelite (spinel, linnaeite: 1876) 2.DA.05    (IUPAC: iron(II) dichromium tetrasulfide)
Davanite (IMA1982-100) 9.EA.25    (K2TiSi6O15)
Davemaoite (perovskite: IMA2020-012a) 4.0  [no] [no] (IUPAC: calcium trioxysilicate)
Davidbrownite-(NH4) (oxalate: IMA2018-129) 10.0  [no] [no]
Davidite (crichtonite) 4.CC.40
Davidite-(Ce) (IMA1966 s.p., 1960) 4.CC.40   
Davidite-(La) (IMA1987 s.p., 1906) 4.CC.40   
Davidite-(Y)H (1966) 4.CC.40  [no] [no]
Davidlloydite (parahopeite: IMA2011-053) 8.CA.  [no] [no] (IUPAC: trizinc diarsenate tetrahydrate)
Davidsmithite (feldspathoid, nepheline: IMA2016-070) 9.F?.  [no] [no]
Davinciite (eudialyte: IMA2011-019) 9.CO.  [no] 
Davisite (pyroxene: IMA2008-030) 9.DA.15   [no] (IUPAC: calcium scandium aluminium hexaoxy silicate)
Davreuxite (Y: 1878) 9.BF.15   
Davyne (cancrinite: 1825) 9.FB.05   
Dawsonite (Y: 1874) 5.BB.10    (IUPAC: sodium aluminium dihydro carbonate)
Deanesmithite (IMA1991-001) 7.FB.20   )
Debattistiite (IMA2011-098) 2.0  [no] [no]
Decagonite (alloy: IMA2015-017) 1.AH.  [no] [no]
Decrespignyite-(Y) (IMA2001-027) 5.CC.35    (IUPAC: tetrayttrium copper chloro pentahydro tetracarbonate dihydrate)
Deerite (IMA1964-016) 9.DH.60   
Defernite (IMA1978-057) 5.BA.25   
Dekatriasartorite (sartorite: IMA2017-071) 2.0  [no] [no] (TlPb58As97S204)
Delafossite (Y: 1873) 4.AB.15    (IUPAC: copper(I) iron(III) dioxide)
Delhayelite (rhodesite: IMA1962 s.p., 1959) 9.EB.10   
Delhuyarite-(Ce) (chevkinite: IMA2016-091) 9.B?.  [no] [no]
Deliensite (IMA1996-013) 7.EB.10    (IUPAC: iron(II) diuranyl dihydro disulfate heptahydrate)
Delindeite (seidozerite, lamprophyllite: IMA1987-004) 9.BE.60   
Dellagiustaite (spinel: IMA2017-101) 4.0  [no] [no] (IUPAC: vanadium(II) dialuminium tetraoxide)
Dellaite (IMA1964-005) 9.BG.45    (IUPAC: hexacalcium heptaoxodisilicate tetraoxysilicate dihydroxyl)
Deloneite (apatite: IMA1995-036 Rd) 8.BN.05   
Deloryite (IMA1990-037) 4.FL.85    (IUPAC: tetracoper uranyl dimolybdenum hexahydro octaoxide)
Delrioite (delrioite: IMA1962 s.p., 1959 Rd) 4.HG.35    (IUPAC: strontium divanadate(V) tetrahydrate)
Deltalumite (spinel: IMA2016-027) 4.0  [no] [no] ((Al0.67☐0.33)Al2O4)
Deltanitrogen (IMA2019-067b) 1.C0.  [no] [no]
DelvauxiteQ (amorphous: 1836) 8.DM.35    Note: an ill-defined hydrous ferric phosphate, related minerals: amorphous diadochite and triclinic destinezite. 
Demagistrisite (IMA2018-059) 9.B?.  [no] [no] (IUPAC: barium dicalcium tetramanganese(III) decaoxytrisilicate heptaoxodisilicate tetrahydroxyl trihydrate)
Demartinite (fluorosilicate: IMA2006-034) 3.CH.20   [no] (IUPAC: dipotassium hexafluorosilicate)
Demesmaekerite (IMA1965-019) 4.JJ.20    (IUPAC: dilead pentacopper diuranyl hexahydro hexaselenate(IV) dihydrate)
Demicheleite 2.FC.25
Demicheleite-(Br) (IMA2007-022) 2.FC.25   [no] (IUPAC: bismuth sulfide bromide)
Demicheleite-(Cl) (IMA2008-020) 2.FC.25   [no] (IUPAC: bismuth sulfide chloride)
Demicheleite-(I) (IMA2009-049) 2.FC.  [no]  (IUPAC: bismuth sulfide iodide)
Dendoraite-(NH4) (IMA2020-103) 8.DH.  [no] [no]
Deynekoite (cerite: IMA2021-108) 8.AD.  [no] [no]
Denisovite (IMA1982-031) 9.HA.85    (KCa2Si3O8F)
Denningite (IMA1967 s.p., 1963) 4.JK.30   
Depmeierite (cancrinite: IMA2009-075) 9.FB.05  [no] [no]
Derbylite (Y: 1897) 4.JB.55   
Derriksite (IMA1971-033) 4.JG.30    (IUPAC: tetracopper uranyl hexahydro diselenate(IV))
Dervillite (IMA1983 s.p., 1941 Rd) 2.LA.10    (IUPAC: disilver sulfarsenite)
Desautelsite (hydrotalcite: IMA1978-016) 5.DA.50   
Descloizite (descloizite: 1854) 8.BH.40    (IUPAC: lead zinc hydro vanadate)
Despujolsite (fleischerite: IMA1967-039) 7.DF.25   
Dessauite-(Y) (crichtonite: IMA1994-057) 4.CC.40   
Destinezite (sanjuanite-destinezite: IMA2000-E, 1881 Rd) 8.DB.05  [no] [no]Note: the triclinic counterpart of the amorphous diadochite. 
Deveroite-(Ce) (oxalate: IMA2013-003) 10.0  [no]  (IUPAC: dicerium trioxalate decahydrate)
Devilliersite (sapphirine: IMA2020-073) 9.0  [no] [no]
Devilline (devilline: IMA1971 s.p., 1864) 7.DD.30    (IUPAC: calcium tetracopper hexahydro disulfate trihydrate)
Devitoite (astrophyllite, devitoite: IMA2009-010) 9.E?.  [no] 
Dewindtite (phosphuranylite: 1922) 8.EC.10    (IUPAC: dihydrogen trilead hexauranyl tetraoxo tetraphosphate dodecahydrate)
Dewitite (chabournéite: IMA2019-098) 2.HD.  [no] [no]
Diaboleite (perovskite: IMA2007 s.p., 1923) 3.DB.05    (IUPAC: copper dilead dichloride tetrahydroxide)
Diadochite (amorphous: 1837) 8.DB.05    Note: the amorphous form of triclinic destinezite. 
Diamond (Y: old) 1.CB.10a   
Diaoyudaoite (magnetoplumbite: IMA1985-005) 4.CC.45    (IUPAC: sodium undecaluminium heptadecaoxide)
Diaphorite (Y: 1871) 2.JB.05    (IUPAC: trisilver dilead triantimonide octasulfide)
Diaspore ("O(OH)" group: 1801) 4.FD.10    (IUPAC: hydroaluminium oxide)
Dickinsonite-(KMnNa) (arrojadite: IMA2005-048, 1878) 8.BF.05   
Dickite (kaolinite: 1930) 9.ED.05   
Dickthomssenite (IMA2000-047) 4.HD.25    (IUPAC: magnesium divanadium hexaoxide heptahydrate)
Diegogattaite (IMA2012-096) 9.E  [no] 
Dienerite (IMA2019-E, IMA2006-C) 2.0  [no] [no]
Dietrichite (halotrichite: 1878) 7.CB.85    (IUPAC: zinc dialuminium tetrasulfate docosahydrate)
Dietzeite (Y: 1894) 4.KD.05    (IUPAC: dicalcium diiodate chromate monohydrate)
Digenite (digenite: IMA1962 s.p., 1844) 2.BA.10    (Cu1.8S)
Dimorphite (Y: 1849) 2.FA.10    (IUPAC: tetrarsenic trisulfide)
Dingdaohengite-(Ce) (chevkinite: IMA2005-014) 9.BE.70   [no]
Dinite (Y: 1852) 10.BA.15   
Diopside (pyroxene: IMA1988 s.p., 1800) 9.DA.15    (IUPAC: calcium magnesium hexaoxy disilicate)
Dioptase (Y: 1797) 9.CJ.30    (IUPAC: copper trioxy silicate monohydrate)
Dioskouriite (IMA2015-106) 3.0  [no] [no] (IUPAC: calcium tetracopper tetrahydro hexachloride tetrahydrate)
Direnzoite (zeolitic tectosilicate: IMA2006-044) 9.GF.55   [no]
Dissakisite (epidote, allanite) 9.BG.05b
Dissakisite-(Ce) (IMA1990-004) 9.BG.05b   
Dissakisite-(La) (IMA2003-007) 9.BG.05   [no] 
Disulfodadsonite (dadsonite: IMA2011-076) 2.0  [no]  (Pb11Sb13S30(S2)0.5)
Dittmarite (Y: 1887) 8.CH.20    (IUPAC: ammonium magnesium phosphate monohydrate)
Diversilite-(Ce) (IMA2002-043) 9.CB.10   [no]
Dixenite (hematolite: 1920) 8.BE.45   
Djerfisherite (djerfisherite: IMA1965-028) 2.FC.05   
Djurleite (IMA1967 s.p., 1962) 2.BA.05    (IUPAC: hentricontacopper hexadecasulfide)
Dmisokolovite (IMA2013-079) 8.0  [no] [no] (IUPAC: tripotassium pentacopper aluminium dioxo(tetrarsenate))
Dmisteinbergite (dmisteinbergite: IMA1989-010) 9.EG.15   
Dmitryivanovite (IMA2006-035) 4.BC.10   [no] (IUPAC: calcium dialuminium tetraoxide)
Dobrovolskyite (IMA2019-106) 7.0  [no] [no] (IUPAC: tetrasodium calcium trisulfate)
Dobšináite (roselite: IMA2020-081)  [no] [no]
Dokuchaevite (IMA2018-012) 8.0  [no] [no] (IUPAC: octacopper chloro dioxotrivanadate)
Dolerophanite (natrochalcite: 1873) 7.BB.20    (IUPAC: dicopper oxosulfate)
Dollaseite-(Ce) (epidote, dollaseite: IMA1987-K Rd) 9.BG.05   
Dolomite (Y: 1792) 5.AB.10    (IUPAC: calcium magnesium dicarbonate)
Doloresite (Y: 1957) 4.HE.30    (IUPAC: trivanadium(IV) tetrahydro tetraoxide)
Domerockite (IMA2009-016) 8.C  [no] [no] (IUPAC: tetracopper trihydro arsenate hydroxoarsenate monohydrate)
Domeykite (metalloid alloy: 1845) 2.AA.10b    (IUPAC: tricopper arsenide)
Domeykite-β (metalloid alloy: IMA2008-B, 1949 Rd) 2.AA.  [no] [no]
Donbassite (chlorite: 1940) 9.EC.55   
Dondoellite (IMA2021-048) 8.CG.  [no] [no]
Dongchuanite (dongchuanite: IMA2021-058) 8.BG.  [no] [no]
Donharrisite (IMA1987-007) 2.BD.20    (IUPAC: trinickel trimercury nonasulfide) 
Donnayite-(Y) (IMA1978-007) 5.CC.05    (IUPAC: sodium tristrontium calcium yttrium hexacarbonate trihydrate)
Donowensite (IMA2020-067) 4.0  [no] [no]
Donpeacorite (pyroxene: IMA1982-045) 9.DA.05    (IUPAC: (manganese(II),magnesium) hexaoxydisilicate)
Donwilhelmsite (IMA2018-113) 9.0  [no] [no] (IUPAC: calcium tetraluminium undecaoxy disilicate)
Dorallcharite (alunite, alunite: IMA1992-041) 7.BC.10    (IUPAC: thallium triiron(III) hexahydro disulfate)
Dorfmanite (IMA1979-053) 8.CJ.60    (IUPAC: disodium hydroxophosphate dihydrate)
Dorrite (sapphirine: IMA1987-054) 9.DH.40   
Douglasite (Y: 1880) 3.CJ.20    (IUPAC: dipotassium iron(II) tetrachloride dihydrate)
Dovyrenite (IMA2007-002) 9.BE.23   [no] (IUPAC: hexacalcium zirconium  di(heptaoxodisilicate) tetrahydroxyl)
Downeyite (IMA1974-063) 4.DE.05    (IUPAC: selenium(IV) oxide)
Doyleite (IMA1980-041) 4.FE.10    (IUPAC: aluminium trihydroxide)
Dozyite (corrensite: IMA1993-042) 9.EC.60   [no] A 1:1 regular interstratification of trioctahedral serpentine and trioctahedral chlorite units. 
Dravertite (IMA2014-104) 7.AB.  [no] [no] (IUPAC: copper magnesium disulfate)
Dravite (tourmaline: 1884) 9.CK.05   
Drechslerite (IMA2019-061) 2.0  [no] [no]
Dresserite (dundasite: IMA1968-027) 5.DB.10    (IUPAC: dibarium tetraluminium octahydro tetracarbonate trihydrate)
Dreyerite (zircon: IMA1978-077) 8.AD.35    (IUPAC: bismuth vanadate)
Dritsite (hydrotalcite: IMA2019-017) 4.0  [no] [no]
Drobecite (starkeyite: IMA2002-034) 7.CB.15  [no] [no] (IUPAC: cadmium sulfate tetrahydrate)
Droninoite (hydrotalcite: IMA2008-003) 3.DA.60   [no]
Drugmanite (IMA1978-081) 8.BH.15    (IUPAC: dilead iron(III) dihydro phosphate hydroxophosphate)
Drysdallite (molybdenite: IMA1973-027) 2.EA.30    (IUPAC: molybdenum diselenide)
Dualite (eudialyte: IMA2005-019) 9.CO.10   [no]
Dufrénite (dufrénite: 1803) 8.DK.15   
Dufrénoysite (sartorite: 1845) 2.HC.05d    (IUPAC: dilead diarsenide pentasulfide)
Duftite (adelite: 1920) 8.BH.35    (IUPAC: lead copper hydro arsenate)
Dugganite (dugganite: IMA1978-034) 8.DL.20    (IUPAC: trilead trizinc tellurate diarsenate)
Dukeite (IMA1999-021) 7.DF.80   [no]
Dumontite (Y: 1924) 8.EC.15    (IUPAC: dilead triuranyl dioxodiphosphate pentahydrate)
Dumortierite (dumortierite: IMA2013 s.p., 1881 Rd) 9.AJ.10    (IUPAC: aluminium hexaluminium octadecaoxy borotrisilicate)
Dundasite (dundasite: 1894) 5.DB.10    (IUPAC: lead dialuminium tetrahydro dicarbonate hydrate)
Durangite (titanite: 1869) 8.BH.10    (IUPAC: sodium aluminium fluo-arsenate)
Duranusite (IMA1973-003) 2.FA.05    (IUPAC: tetrarsenide sulfide)
Dusmatovite (milarite: IMA1994-010) 9.CM.05   [no]
Dussertite (alunite, crandallite: IMA1999 s.p., 1925 Rd) 8.BL.10    (IUPAC: barium triiron(III) hexahydro arsenate hydroxoarsenate)
Dutkevichite-(Ce) (joaquinite: IMA2019-102) 9.CE.  [no] [no]
Dutrowite (tourmaline: IMA2019-082) 9.CK.  [no] [no]
Duttonite ("O(OH)" group: 1956) 4.HE.35   
Dwornikite (kieserite: IMA1981-031) 7.CB.05    (IUPAC: nickel sulfate monohydrate)
Dymkovite (seelite: IMA2010-087) 4.J?.  [no]  (IUPAC: nickel diuranyl diarsenate(III) heptahydrate)
Dypingite (IMA1970-011) 5.DA.05    (IUPAC: pentamagnesium dihydro tetracarbonate pentahydrate)
Dyrnaesite-(La) (vitusite: IMA2014-070) 8.0  [no] [no]
Dyscrasite (allargentum: 1832) 2.AA.35   
Dzhalindite (perovskite, söhngeite: IMA1967 s.p., 1963) 4.FC.05    (IUPAC: indium trihydroxide)
Dzharkenite (pyrite: IMA1993-054) 2.EB.05a    (IUPAC: iron diselenide)
Dzhuluite (garnet: IMA2010-064) 4.0  [no]  (IUPAC: tricalcium (tin antimony) tri(iron(III) tetraoxide))
Dzierżanowskite (IMA2014-032) 2.BA.  [no] [no] (IUPAC: calcium dicopper disulfide)

External links
IMA Database of Mineral Properties/ RRUFF Project
Mindat.org - The Mineral Database
Webmineral.com
Mineralatlas.eu minerals D